Hannibal Caesar Carter (February 1835 - June 1, 1904) was the Secretary of State of Mississippi from September 1 to October 20, 1873, and from November 13, 1873, to January 4, 1874, serving the first term after being appointed when Hiram R. Revels resigned. He also served two non-consecutive terms representing Warren County in the Mississippi House of Representatives, the first from 1872 to 1873 the second from 1876 to 1877, both times as a Republican. In later years he changed his affiliation to Democratic. He was one of several African Americans to serve as Mississippi Secretary of State during the Reconstruction era.

Carter was born in New Albany, Indiana, on February 1835, then moving to Toronto, Canada for his early childhood. He and his brother served in the Native Guards of Louisiana and then the Union Army.

He helped establish the Freedmen's Oklahoma Immigration Association in Chicago in 1881.

He spent his later life in Chicago, Illinois, where he then died at home June 1, 1904 at the age of 69.

References

1835 births
1904 deaths
Secretaries of State of Mississippi
People from Chicago
Republican Party members of the Mississippi House of Representatives